Over Easy is the fifth studio album by Australian indie rock band The Cruel Sea. The album was released in July 1998 and peaked at number 13 the ARIA Charts. The album was supported with a "Takin' All Day" national tour.

Reception

Stewart Mason from AllMusic said "The Cruel Sea have adopted a songwriting style based on slowly evolving layers of loops and samples, with an increased interest in reggae and other world music styles to boot. The Thin Lizzy-like folk-metal of "Hard Times" and the Beck-inspired wonky groove of "13th Floor" in particular reveal appealing new sides to the band. The lazy, summery vibe of the single "Taking All Day" is more traditional Cruel Sea fare, with singer Tex Perkins more to the forefront than he is on the rest of the album. Dismissed by some longtime fans as a misguided experiment, Over Easy is actually a most intriguing album that shows off the group's strengths in new and interesting ways."

Track listing

Charts

Release history

References

1998 albums
The Cruel Sea (band) albums